Batocera saundersii is a species of beetle in the family Cerambycidae. It was described by Pascoe in 1866. It is known from Sumatra.

References

Batocerini
Beetles described in 1866